The Guichón Formation is a Late Cretaceous geologic formation of the Paysandú Group in Uruguay. Dinosaur remains are among the fossils that have been recovered from the formation.

Description 
The Guichón Formation comprises mainly pink-greyish to reddish sandstones, which contain moderate to well-sorted, subrounded, fine to medium-sized grains in a pelitic matrix. These sandstones (which compositionally are feldspathic wackes) are either massive or may instead exhibit parallel lamination, cross-lamination and graded bedding. These lithologies were deposited in southwest-trending alluvial–fluvial systems comprising low-sinuosity channels traversing through sandy plains. Subordinate to the already mentioned sandstones are conglomeratic and pelitic lithologies, interpreted as channel-fill and overbank deposits, respectively. It is inferred that the Guichón Formation was deposited in warm, semi-arid climatic conditions. The formation has been correlated to the Puerto Yeruá Formation of northwestern Argentina.

It is overlain by the Mercedes Formation and overlies the Arapey Formation.

Fossil content 
The following fossils have been reported from the formation:
 Uruguaysuchus aznarezi
 Iguanodontia indet.
 Saltasauridae indet.
 Theropoda indet.

Fossil eggs
 Sphaerovum sp.

See also 
 List of dinosaur-bearing rock formations
 List of stratigraphic units with indeterminate dinosaur fossils
 List of fossiliferous stratigraphic units in Uruguay

References

Bibliography 

 
 
 
 
  
 
 

Geologic formations of Uruguay
Cretaceous System of South America
Cretaceous Uruguay
Albian Stage
Aptian Stage
Cenomanian Stage
Santonian Stage
Turonian Stage
Sandstone formations
Conglomerate formations
Fluvial deposits
Ooliferous formations
Formations
Fossiliferous stratigraphic units of South America
Paleontology in Uruguay
Formations